Anania tennesseensis is a moth in the family Crambidae. It was described by Yang in 2012. It is found in North America, where it has been recorded from Tennessee.

References

Moths described in 2012
Pyraustinae
Moths of North America